Hindi Ka na Mag-iisa (International title: Never Be Alone / ) is a 2012 Philippine television drama romance series broadcast by GMA Network. Directed by Gil Tejada Jr., it stars Jennylyn Mercado and Sid Lucero. It premiered on July 9, 2012 on the network's Afternoon Prime line up replacing Hiram na Puso. The series concluded on October 26, 2012 with a total of 80 episodes. It was replaced by Yesterday's Bride in its timeslot.

Cast and characters

Lead cast
 Jennylyn Mercado as Elisa Santos
 Sid Lucero as Andrew Villagracia

Supporting cast
 Krystal Reyes as Angelica Montenegro
 Frank Magalona as Mark Calderon
 Angelu de Leon as Jordana Montenegro
 Glydel Mercado as Maita Montenegro
 Lloyd Samartino as Bernard Montenegro
 Liza Lorena as Doña Asuncion Montenegro
 Carl Guevarra as Dennis
 Mosang as Betty
 Joey Paras as Mimi
 Saab Magalona as Celine Montenegro

Recurring cast
 Ces Quesada as Gina
 Johnny Revilla as Mesandro Villagracia
 Maybelyn dela Cruz as Sofia
 Jhett Romero as Ben
 Kryshee Grengia as young Elisa
 Gino dela Peña as Greg
 Gillette Sandico as Mark's mother
 Mark Jerome Bautista as young Andrew Villagracia

Ratings
According to AGB Nielsen Philippines' Mega Manila household television ratings, the pilot episode of Hindi Ka na Mag-iisa earned a 15.8% rating. While the final episode scored a 22.9% rating.

References

External links
 

2012 Philippine television series debuts
2012 Philippine television series endings
Filipino-language television shows
GMA Network drama series
Philippine romance television series
Television shows set in the Philippines